The 1991 season of the African Cup Winners' Cup football club tournament was won by Power Dynamos in two-legged final victory against BCC Lions. This was the seventeenth season that the tournament took place for the winners of each African country's domestic cup. Thirty-six sides entered the competition, Ground Fource withdrawing before the 1st leg of the first round, Ports Authority disqualified by CAF after 1st leg of the first round and Arsenal withdrawing at the same stage of the competition.

Preliminary round

|}

First round

|}

Second round

|}

Quarter-finals

|}

Semi-finals

|}

Final

|}

First leg

Second leg

External links
 Results available on CAF Official Website
 Results available on RSSSF

African Cup Winners' Cup
2